Obbolaön is an island in northern Sweden. It lies in the Ume River, where it flows out in the Baltic Sea.

References

Swedish islands in the Baltic
Islands of Västerbotten County